The year 1959 in television involved some significant events. Below is a list of television-related events during 1959.



Events
January 15 – Tyne Tees Television, the Independent Television (ITV) franchise for North East England, begins broadcasting.
February 1 - The earliest known interracial kiss on television occurs during a live performance of the play Hot Summer Night, broadcast on the British ABC program Armchair Theatre on the ITV network. The kiss was between Andrée Melly and Lloyd Reckord, the latter of whom would be featured in another early televised interracial kiss three years later in the play You in Your Small Corner.
February 1 - Nihon Educational Television begins operating to the Kanto region, operating as a for-profit educational television station for its first year.
March 1 – Fuji Television commences its regular operations.
April 6 - KYW-TV in Cleveland (now WKYC) became the first station to use the Eyewitness News name.
May 24 – Television Ecuatoriana, a first television station in Ecuador, a regular broadcasting service to start in Quito and Guayaquil.
May 28 – Initiation of Lebanon's first television station, Télé Liban.
July 13–17 – The Hate That Hate Produced introduces the Nation of Islam to most Americans.
July 24 – The Kitchen Debate occurs in Moscow, recorded on color videotape.
August 21 - The Catholic University of Chile begins broadcasting a partial service over Channel 2. It's the first TV station in Santiago, Chile.
October 16 - OBXY-TV, as predecessor for Panamericana Television, Peru, a first officially regular broadcasting service to start in Lima.
October 22 - Take a Good Look, an innovative comedy series created by Ernie Kovacs, premiered on ABC.
October 27 – Anglia Television, the ITV franchise for Eastern England, begins broadcasting.
October 31 – Ulster Television, the ITV franchise for Northern Ireland, begins broadcasting.
October 31 – Western Nigeria Television (currently known as Nigerian Television Authority) was launched in Nigeria, making the first country to introduce television in Africa.
November 22 – Sandmännchen premieres on East German television channel Deutscher Fernsehfunk. The series would continue airing today on Rundfunk Berlin–Brandenburg.
November 29 – The Grammy Awards are first televised as part of NBC's Sunday Showcase.
December 26 - BNT 1, a member of Bulgarian National Television, a first television station in Bulgaria, an officially regular broadcasting service start in Sofia.

Programs/programmes
Alfred Hitchcock Presents (1955–1962)
American Bandstand (1952–1989)
Armchair Theatre (UK) (1956–1968)
As the World Turns (1956–2010)
Blue Peter (UK) (1958–present)
Bozo the Clown (1949–2001)
Candid Camera (1948–present)
Captain Kangaroo (1955–1984)
Cheyenne (1955–1962)
Come Dancing (UK) (1949–1995)
Dixon of Dock Green (UK) (1955–1976)
Face the Nation (1954–present)
General Motors Presents (Can) (1953–1956, 1958–1961)
Gillette Cavalcade of Sports (1946–1960)
Grandstand (UK) (1958–2007)
Gunsmoke (1955–1975)
Hallmark Hall of Fame (1951–present)
Hancock's Half Hour (1956–1962)
Have Gun – Will Travel (1957-1963)
Howdy Doody (1947–1960)
I Love Lucy (1951–1960)
Jubilee USA (1955–1960)
KPIX Dance Party (1959–1963)
Leave It to Beaver (1957–1963)
Love of Life (1951–1980)
Man with a Camera (1959–1960)
Meet the Press (1947–present)
Men Into Space (1959–1960)
Opportunity Knocks (UK) (1956–1978)
Panorama (UK) (1953–present)
Perry Mason (1957–1966)
Peter Gunn (1958–1961)
Search for Tomorrow (1951–1986)
Take a Good Look (1959-1961)
The Adventures of Ozzie and Harriet (1952–1966)
The Army Game (UK) (1957–1961)
The Bell Telephone Hour (1959-1968)
The Brighter Day (1954–1962)
The Donna Reed Show (1958–1966)
The Ed Sullivan Show (1948–1971)
The Edge of Night (1956–1984)
The Ford Show, Starring Tennessee Ernie Ford (1956–1961)
The Gale Storm Show, Oh! Susanna (1956–1960)
The Good Old Days (UK) (1953–1983)
The Guiding Light (1952–2009)
The Huckleberry Hound Show (1958–1962)
The Jack Benny Program (1950–1965)
The Lawrence Welk Show (1955–1982)
The Milton Berle Show (1954–1967)
The Pat Boone Chevy Showroom (1957–1960)
The Price Is Right (1956–1965)
The Real McCoys (1957–1963)
The Secret Storm (1954–1974)
The Sky at Night (UK) (1957–present)
The Steve Allen Show (1956–1960)
The Texan (1958–1960)
This Man Dawson (1959–1960)
The Today Show (1952–present)
The Tonight Show (1954–present)
The Voice of Firestone (1949–1963)
This Is Your Life (UK) (1955–2003)
This Is Your Life (US) (1952–1961)
Truth or Consequences (1950–1988)
Walt Disney Presents (1958–1961)
Wanted Dead or Alive (1958-1961)
Westinghouse Desilu Playhouse (1958–1960)
What the Papers Say (UK) (1956–2008)
What's My Line (1950–1967)
Zoo Quest (UK) (1954–1964)

Debuts

January 9 – Rawhide, CBS (1959–1966)
January 12 – The Bell Telephone Hour on NBC (1959–1968)
February 4 – Face to Face on BBC Television (1959–1962)
February 12 – As Far as My Feet Will Carry Me on West Germany's ARD (1959)
February 16 – Emergency (1959) (Australia), one of the earliest Australian dramatic TV series
April 4 
 Charlesworth on BBC Television (1959) 
 Shell Presents (1959–1960) (Sydney and Melbourne Australia), Australian dramatic anthology series
May 2 – Markham, featuring Ray Milland, on CBS (1959–1960)
June 1 – Juke Box Jury on BBC Television (1959–1967, 1979, 1989–1990)
September 11 – The Troubleshooters on NBC (1959–1960)
September 12 – Bonanza on NBC, the first weekly television series broadcast completely in color (1959–1973)
September 12 – The Man and the Challenge on NBC (1959–1960)
September 15 – Laramie on NBC (1959–1963)
September 20 – NBC Sunday Showcase on NBC (1959–1960)
September 21 – Love and Marriage on NBC (1959–1960)
September 30 – Men Into Space on CBS (1959–1960)
October 2 – Rod Serling's The Twilight Zone debuts on CBS (1959–1964)
October 4 
Dennis the Menace on CBS (1959–1963)
The Rebel on ABC (1959–1961)
October 5 – Bourbon Street Beat on ABC (1959–1960)
October 7 – Hawaiian Eye on ABC (1959–1963)
October 15 - The Untouchables on ABC (1959–1963)
Unknown date
Adelaide Tonight – 1959–1973 (Adelaide, Australia)
Bandwagon (1959–1960) (Melbourne, Australia, on HSV-7)
The Bert Newton Show (1959–1960) (Melbourne, Australia, on GTV-9)
The Bobby Limb Show (1959–1964) (Australia) (title changed in 1961 to The Mobil-Limb Show)
Club Seven (1959–1961) (Melbourne, Australia)
The Quick Draw McGraw Show in syndication (1959-1962)
Rocky And His Friends, Jay Ward's second series (1959-1964).
Tales of the Riverbank (1959–1963).                                      
This Man Dawson in syndication (1959-1960)

Ending this year

Births

References